The 1977 Oakland Raiders season was the team's 18th season overall, and 8th season since joining the NFL. The Raiders entered the season as the defending Super Bowl champions. The team couldn't improve on their 13-1 record from last year and finished 11-3, but it was good enough for the second best in the AFC West.

The Raiders reached the AFC Championship Game for the fifth consecutive season, and their sixth in eight years. They lost the AFC Championship, however, to the division rival Denver Broncos. This marked the seventh time in ten seasons that the Raiders' season ended in the AFL Championship/AFC Conference Championship game.

The 1977 Raiders set a professional football record with 681 rushing attempts. Fullback Mark van Eeghen 324 times for 1273 yards, and running back Clarence Davis ran 194 times for 787 yards.

Offseason

NFL Draft

Roster

Regular season

Schedule

Results

Week 1

Week 2

Week 3

Week 6

Week 11

Week 13 
Network: CBS
Announcers: Vin Scully, Alex Hawkins
Oakland capitalizing on Minnesota mistakes, scored three times in the first 8 minutes and kept their hopes for a playoff berth alive. "We Got Stomped", Vikings coach Bud Grant said after his team had lost a total of five fumbles and had three passes intercepted. Ken Stabler threw three touchdown passes one to Carl Garrett for 2 yards, and two others to Cliff Branch from 32 and 10 yards. Mark Van Eeghan who rushed for 112 yards on 28 yards got the Raiders day going with a 2-yard touchdown run. While Willie Hall of Super Bowl XI fame scored a fumble recovery touchdown off a Tommy Kramer blunder.

Standings

Playoffs 

Oakland made the playoffs as a wild card and won its divisional round game against the Baltimore Colts when Errol Mann tied the game with a late field goal, set up by a pass to tight end Dave Casper, a play known as the Ghost to the Post. In the second overtime, Casper caught another touchdown pass for the victory. The following week on New Year's Day, they lost the AFC Championship Game 20–17 in Denver.

Statistics

Passing

Rushing

Receiving

References

External links 
 1977 Raiders on Pro Football Reference
 1977 Raiders on Database Football

Oakland
Oakland Raiders seasons
Oakland